In the field of hyperbolic geometry, the order-5 hexagonal tiling honeycomb arises as one of 11 regular paracompact honeycombs in 3-dimensional hyperbolic space. It is paracompact because it has cells composed of an infinite number of faces.  Each cell consists of a hexagonal tiling whose vertices lie on a horosphere, a flat plane in hyperbolic space that approaches a single ideal point at infinity.

The Schläfli symbol of the order-5 hexagonal tiling honeycomb is {6,3,5}. Since that of the hexagonal tiling is {6,3}, this honeycomb has five such hexagonal tilings meeting at each edge.  Since the Schläfli symbol of the icosahedron is {3,5}, the vertex figure of this honeycomb is an icosahedron.  Thus, 20 hexagonal tilings meet at each vertex of this honeycomb.

Symmetry

A lower-symmetry construction of index 120, [6,(3,5)*], exists with regular dodecahedral fundamental domains, and an icosahedral Coxeter-Dynkin diagram with 6 axial infinite-order (ultraparallel) branches.

Images
The order-5 hexagonal tiling honeycomb is similar to the 2D hyperbolic regular paracompact order-5 apeirogonal tiling, {∞,5}, with five apeirogonal faces meeting around every vertex.

Related polytopes and honeycombs 
The order-5 hexagonal tiling honeycomb is a regular hyperbolic honeycomb in 3-space, and one of 11 which are paracompact.

There are 15 uniform honeycombs in the [6,3,5] Coxeter group family, including this regular form, and its regular dual, the order-6 dodecahedral honeycomb.

The order-5 hexagonal tiling honeycomb has a related alternation honeycomb, represented by  ↔ , with icosahedron and triangular tiling cells.

It is a part of sequence of regular hyperbolic honeycombs  of the form {6,3,p}, with hexagonal tiling facets:

It is also part of a sequence of regular polychora and honeycombs with icosahedral vertex figures:

Rectified order-5 hexagonal tiling honeycomb 

The rectified order-5 hexagonal tiling honeycomb, t1{6,3,5},  has icosahedron and trihexagonal tiling facets, with a pentagonal prism vertex figure.

It is similar to the 2D hyperbolic infinite-order square tiling, r{∞,5} with pentagon and apeirogonal faces. All vertices are on the ideal surface.

Truncated order-5 hexagonal tiling honeycomb 

The truncated order-5 hexagonal tiling honeycomb, t0,1{6,3,5},  has icosahedron and truncated hexagonal tiling facets, with a pentagonal pyramid vertex figure.

Bitruncated order-5 hexagonal tiling honeycomb 

The bitruncated order-5 hexagonal tiling honeycomb, t1,2{6,3,5},  has hexagonal tiling and truncated icosahedron facets, with a digonal disphenoid vertex figure.

Cantellated order-5 hexagonal tiling honeycomb 

The cantellated order-5 hexagonal tiling honeycomb, t0,2{6,3,5},  has icosidodecahedron, rhombitrihexagonal tiling, and pentagonal prism facets, with a wedge vertex figure.

Cantitruncated order-5 hexagonal tiling honeycomb 

The cantitruncated order-5 hexagonal tiling honeycomb, t0,1,2{6,3,5},  has truncated icosahedron, truncated trihexagonal tiling, and pentagonal prism facets, with a mirrored sphenoid vertex figure.

Runcinated order-5 hexagonal tiling honeycomb 

The runcinated order-5 hexagonal tiling honeycomb, t0,3{6,3,5},  has dodecahedron, hexagonal tiling, pentagonal prism, and hexagonal prism facets, with an irregular triangular antiprism vertex figure.

Runcitruncated order-5 hexagonal tiling honeycomb 

The runcitruncated order-5 hexagonal tiling honeycomb, t0,1,3{6,3,5},  has truncated hexagonal tiling, rhombicosidodecahedron, pentagonal prism, and dodecagonal prism cells, with an isosceles-trapezoidal pyramid vertex figure.

Runcicantellated order-5 hexagonal tiling honeycomb 

The runcicantellated order-5 hexagonal tiling honeycomb is the same as the runcitruncated order-6 dodecahedral honeycomb.

Omnitruncated order-5 hexagonal tiling honeycomb 

The omnitruncated order-5 hexagonal tiling honeycomb, t0,1,2,3{6,3,5},  has truncated trihexagonal tiling, truncated icosidodecahedron, decagonal prism, and dodecagonal prism facets, with an irregular tetrahedral vertex figure.

Alternated order-5 hexagonal tiling honeycomb 

The alternated order-5 hexagonal tiling honeycomb, h{6,3,5},  ↔ , has triangular tiling and icosahedron facets, with a truncated icosahedron vertex figure. It is a quasiregular honeycomb.

Cantic order-5 hexagonal tiling honeycomb 

The cantic order-5 hexagonal tiling honeycomb, h2{6,3,5},  ↔ , has trihexagonal tiling, truncated icosahedron, and icosidodecahedron facets, with a triangular prism vertex figure.

Runcic order-5 hexagonal tiling honeycomb 

The runcic order-5 hexagonal tiling honeycomb, h3{6,3,5},  ↔ , has triangular tiling, rhombicosidodecahedron, dodecahedron, and triangular prism facets, with a triangular cupola vertex figure.

Runcicantic order-5 hexagonal tiling honeycomb 

The runcicantic order-5 hexagonal tiling honeycomb, h2,3{6,3,5},  ↔ , has trihexagonal tiling, truncated icosidodecahedron, truncated dodecahedron, and triangular prism facets, with a rectangular pyramid vertex figure.

See also 
 Convex uniform honeycombs in hyperbolic space
 Regular tessellations of hyperbolic 3-space
 Paracompact uniform honeycombs

References 

Coxeter, Regular Polytopes, 3rd. ed., Dover Publications, 1973. . (Tables I and II: Regular polytopes and honeycombs, pp. 294–296)
 The Beauty of Geometry: Twelve Essays (1999), Dover Publications,  (Chapter 10, Regular Honeycombs in Hyperbolic Space) Table III
 Jeffrey R. Weeks The Shape of Space, 2nd edition  (Chapter 16-17: Geometries on Three-manifolds I,II)
 Norman Johnson Uniform Polytopes, Manuscript
 N.W. Johnson: The Theory of Uniform Polytopes and Honeycombs, Ph.D. Dissertation, University of Toronto, 1966 
 N.W. Johnson: Geometries and Transformations, (2018) Chapter 13: Hyperbolic Coxeter groups

Hexagonal tilings
Honeycombs (geometry)